Quatro de Setembro Theater (Teatro 4 de Setembro, or 4 September theatre)) is located in the Brazilian city of Teresina, capital of Piauí state.

It was inaugurated on April 21, 1894.  It has a capacity of 560.

References

Theatres in Piauí
Buildings and structures in Piauí
Theatres completed in 1894